Jerome Robert Dupont (born February 21, 1962 in Ottawa, Ontario) is a former Canadian professional ice hockey defenceman.

Biography
As a youth, Dupont played in the 1974 and 1975 Quebec International Pee-Wee Hockey Tournaments with a minor ice hockey team from Gloucester, Ontario.

Dupont played for the Toronto Marlboros of the Ontario Hockey League at the age of 16.  He was drafted in the first round, 15th overall by the Chicago Black Hawks in the 1980 NHL Entry Draft.  He retired in 1987 after seven years of NHL with the Blackhawks and the Toronto Maple Leafs and AHL hockey with the Springfield Indians and Newmarket Saints.

He started his junior coaching career with the 1998 Thornhill Rattlers of the Ontario Provincial Junior A Hockey League.  Within two years the team won the Dudley Hewitt Cup as Central Canadian Junior "A" Champions.  In 2006–07, as the coach of the Aurora Tigers, he led the team to the Dudley Hewitt Cup, and then later won the Royal Bank Cup 2007 as National Junior "A" Champions.

When Dupont played in the United States he was given the nickname Jerry, simply because Jerome wasn't a common name among his American teammates.

On November 4 he was named head coach of the Olympiques de Gatineau of Quebec Major Junior Hockey League. He is currently the head coach of the Cobourg Cougars of the Ontario Junior Hockey League.

Career statistics

Regular season and playoffs

References

External links

1962 births
Living people
Canadian ice hockey defencemen
Chicago Blackhawks draft picks
Chicago Blackhawks players
Gatineau Olympiques coaches
National Hockey League first-round draft picks
Ice hockey people from Ottawa
Toronto Maple Leafs players
Canadian ice hockey coaches